Michael Daniel “Danie” Burger (25 March 1933 – 17 January 1990) was a South African hurdler. He competed in the men's 110 metres hurdles at the 1956 Summer Olympics. He won a silver medal in the pole vault at the 1962 British Empire and Commonwealth Games, representing Rhodesia and Nyasaland. He also finished fourth in the 4 × 110 yards relay (with Jeffery Smith, Johan Du Preez, and Roy Collins) at the 1962 Games.

References

External links
 

1933 births
1990 deaths
Athletes (track and field) at the 1956 Summer Olympics
South African male hurdlers
Olympic athletes of South Africa
People from Lichtenburg
Rhodesian athletes
Athletes (track and field) at the 1962 British Empire and Commonwealth Games
Commonwealth Games silver medallists for Rhodesia and Nyasaland
Commonwealth Games medallists in athletics
South African emigrants to Rhodesia
Afrikaner people
White Rhodesian people
Medallists at the 1962 British Empire and Commonwealth Games